The discography of Dolcenera, an Italian singer-songwriter, consists of seven studio albums and one extended play, which spawned seventeen singles as a lead artist, three promotional singles and twenty-one music videos.

After releasing her debut single in 2002, "Solo tu", Dolcenera recorded her first studio album, Sorriso nucleare, which was released after her appearance at the Sanremo Music Festival 2003, during which she received first prize in the Newcomers' section for her entry "Siamo tutti là fuori", which became her first top ten single in Italy.

Her second and third studio albums, Un mondo perfetto and Il popolo dei sogni, were released in 2005 and 2006, and they were both awarded platinum for sales in Italy. In 2006, a compilation album including tracks from these two records, titled Un mondo perfetto, was released in Germany, Switzerland and Austria only.

Her first studio album for a major label, Dolcenera nel paese delle meraviglie, was released for Sony Music in 2009 and spawned the hit single "Il mio amore unico". Dolcenera later signed a new recording deal with EMI. Evoluzione della specie, her fifth studio album, was released in 2011, and re-released the following year under the title Evoluzione della specie², with additional tracks including the single "Ci vediamo a casa".

After releasing the singles "Niente al mondo", "Accendi lo spirito", "Fantastica" and "Un peccato" between 2014 and 2015, Dolcenera released a new album, Le stelle non-tremano, in September 2015. The studio set became her second top 5 album in Italy.

Dolcenera was also a member of the supergroup Artisti Uniti per l'Abruzzo, which released the charity single "Domani 21/04.09", and she appeared as a featured artist on the Italian version of British rapper Professor Green's single "Read All About (Tutto quello che devi sapere)", included both in his album At Your Inconvenience and in Dolcenera's Evoluzione della specie².
During her career Dolcenera appeared on the albums of other Italian recording artists, including Roberto Vecchioni, Claudio Baglioni and the progressive rock band Premiata Forneria Marconi.

Albums

Studio albums

Compilation albums

Extended plays

Singles

As lead singer

As featured artist

Promotional singles

Other charted songs

Music videos

Other appearances

References

Discographies of Italian artists